Lunar Vacation are an American indie rock band from Atlanta, Georgia.

History
Lunar Vacation released their first EP in 2017 titled Swell. The group released their second EP, Artificial Flavors, in 2018. In 2021, the band released their debut full-length album through Keeled Scales called Inside Every Fig Is A Dead Wasp. The album was produced by Daniel Gleason of Grouplove.

References

Musical groups from Atlanta